Martin Starkie (25 November 1922 – 5 November 2010) was an English actor, writer and director for theatre, radio and television. The Oxford University Poetry Society administers the annual Martin Starkie Prize in his honour.

Early life
Martin Starkie was born in Burnley and educated at Burnley Grammar School and Exeter College, Oxford, under critic Nevill Coghill. In 1946 he founded the Oxford University Poetry Society, and with Roy McNab edited the Oxford Poetry magazine in 1947.

Career
He made his name in the BBC's The Third Programme and on television in the 1950s. He went on to write with Nevill Coghill and composers Richard Hill and John Hawkins, and to produce and direct Canterbury Tales, based on Coghill's translation of the original, first in Oxford, then in the West End, on Broadway and in Australia.

He founded the Chaucer Festival in 1986 which ran annual events in Southwark and London for a number of years and later set up the Chaucer Centre in Canterbury. He is represented, as the character of Geoffrey Chaucer, by a bas-relief image on the plinth of the Chaucer statue in Canterbury which is situated at the junction of Best Lane and the High Street.

References

External links
 
 

Alumni of Exeter College, Oxford
People educated at Burnley Grammar School
English theatre directors
People from Burnley
2010 deaths
1922 births
English male dramatists and playwrights
20th-century English dramatists and playwrights
20th-century English male writers